Cynthia Bendlin is a Paraguayan activist against human trafficking. As of 2008 she is the manager of the International Order for Migration's counter-trafficking information campaign in the borders of Argentina, Brazil and Paraguay. She has led seminars about how to combat human trafficking in Argentina, Brazil, and Paraguay. Bendlin and her family have faced threats due to her work against human trafficking, and she has been forced to move.

Bendlin received a 2008 International Women of Courage Award. At the award dinner, she stated, “This [award] is not for us; it is for all that we are fighting for.”
She also received the Ruby Prize from the Soroptimist International Millenium  Club in 2013.

References

Living people
21st-century Paraguayan women
Paraguayan human rights activists
Women human rights activists
Year of birth missing (living people)
Recipients of the International Women of Courage Award
Place of birth missing (living people)